The postmaster of the United States House of Representatives was an employee of the United States Congress from 1834 to 1992.

Before the creation of the office of postmaster, mail duties were handled by workers in the office of the doorkeeper, who were paid additional compensation. The postmaster was made into a distinct and permanent House of Representatives employee in 1832, and in 1834, William J. McCormick, a doorkeeper's office employee, was named as the first House postmaster. Four years later, the postmaster was also given responsibility for the Capitol post office. The office of postmaster was abolished in 1992; House mail handling procedures were reassigned to other officers and private entities.

A total of twenty-one postmasters served in the House. One postmaster, William S. King, served as a U.S. representative after his service as postmaster.

List of postmasters

Notes

Sources
Postmasters of the House, Office of the Clerk
House Journal, various editions;
Congressional Globe, various editions;
Congressional Record, various editions;Biographical Directory of the United States Congress (2005);Congressional Pictorial Directory, various editions.Official Congressional Directory'', various editions.

 
Employees of the United States House of Representatives